This Theodore Roosevelt bibliography lists the works written by Theodore Roosevelt. Roosevelt was a diligent and skilled writer. When he lost his fortune in the Dakota Territory in 1886 and needed to make a living to support his family, he did so for the rest of his life by writing. Roosevelt wrote on a wide range of topics and genres, including history (The Naval War of 1812), autobiography, biography (Oliver Cromwell), commentary and editorials (whole series for the Kansas City Star and The Outlook), memoirs (of his experiences in Cuba leading the Rough Riders), nature (Summer Birds of the Adirondacks), and guide books (New York: Historic Towns). In addition, by one estimate Roosevelt wrote more than 150,000 letters. In his style, Roosevelt could be strong, introspective, exuberant, or angry—the subject dictated the style.

Compendia
 Auchincloss, Louis, ed. Theodore Roosevelt: Letters and Speeches (2004) 
 Brands, H. W. The selected letters of Theodore Roosevelt (2001) online
 O'Toole, Patricia ed. In the Words of Theodore Roosevelt : Quotations from the Man in the Arena (Cornell University Press, 2012)

 Hart, Albert Bushnell, and Herbert Ronald Ferleger, Theodore Roosevelt Cyclopedia (1941) online

 Morison, Elting E. ed. The letters of Theodore Roosevelt (8 vol Harvard UP, 1951-1954); vol 7 online cover 1909-1912

The Complete Works of Theodore Roosevelt  (2017) 4500 pages in Kindle format   online for $1 at Amazon, primary sources

Books
Most are online and can be downloaded at this site
 
 
 
 
 
 
 
 
 
 
 
 
  (with George Bird Grinnell)
 
  (with Henry Cabot Lodge)
  (with George Bird Grinnell)
 
 
  (with George Bird Grinnell)
 
 
 
 
 
 
  (with T. S. Van Dyke, D. G. Elliot, and A. J. Stone)
 
 
 
 
 
 
 
 
 
 
 
 
 
  (with Edmund Heller)
  (with Edmund Heller)

Articles
 
 
 
 
 
 
 
 
 
 
 
 
 
 
 
 
 
 
 
 
 
 
 
 
 
 
 
 
 
 
 
 
 "Men", a column in Ladies' Home Journal in 1916 and 1917

Collections

Selected biographies of Theodore Roosevelt

References

External links
 Almanac of Theodore Roosevelt
 

Bibliographies by writer
Bibliographies of American writers